Show Business is a 1938 Australian film musical directed by A. R. Harwood and starring Bert Matthews. It is considered a 'substantially lost' film, with only rushes from a single minor scene left.

Plot
Two brothers, Bill and Wally Winter, become infatuated with a gold digger, Nina Bellamy. She persuades them to ask their wealthy father, Sir James, for £10,000 so Bill can produce a stage show and Wally a movie, both starring Nina. Sir James discovers the truth about Nina and gives his son the money, provided they leave town in secret for one month to write their shows and that they only use new talent.

Bill goes to a country town and discovers a local amateur group. He buys their show and brings it to the city, where it is a big success. Wally meets a girl from a local film exchange and they decide release an old Australian film with comic commentary. An angry Nina tries to disrupt the preview of the film but fails and it is a big success. Nina then tries to blackmail Sir James but fails.

Cast
Jimmy McMahon as Wally Winter
John Barrington as Bill Winter
Bert Matthews as Cogs
Joyce Hunt as Nina Bellamy
Fred Tupper as Fred Hamilton
Chick Arnold as Red
Bonnie Dunn as tap dancer
Barbara James as singer
Betty Matear as Jean
Guy Hastings as Sir James Winter
Doulgas Stuart as Benson
Fay Astor as Elsie
Charmaine Ross as Joan
Paul Leon as Jackson
Jimmy Coates as his band
the Pathe Duncan Ballet

Production
Harwood claimed he had a great deal of difficulty casting the female leads, seeing over 700 applications. Shooting started in April 1938 at Cinesound's studio in St Kilda, Melbourne. The studio was found to be too cramped and inadequately equipped so the unit was shipped to Sydney in May where the film was completed at Pagewood Studios. Shooting wound up in July.

Filming was also suspended due to an amendment to the British Quota Act which meant that Australian films were no longer considered "British" under a local quota.

Many of the cast were popular radio personalities at the time.

Reception
The film passed the quality test under the NSW Film Quota Act. It was not a commercial success, and Harwood was forced to seek work as a suburban manager and insurance agent. He later remade the film as Night Club (1951).

References

External links
 
 Show Business at National Film and Sound Archive
Show Business at Oz Movies
Show Business at Australian Variety Theatre Archives
Copyright documentation relating to the film at National Archives of Australia

1938 films
Australian musical drama films
1930s musical drama films
Lost Australian films
Australian black-and-white films
1938 lost films
Lost musical drama films